Brudermühlstraße is an U-Bahn station in the Sendling suburb in Munich, Germany on the U3. The station is located below the Brüdermühlstraße, a part of Munich's Mittlerer Ring ring road system on a junction between the west-east Brüdermühlstraße and the north-south Implerstraße. The station is located 3.8 km southwest of the city centre and 2 km (25 minute walk) south of the Theresienwiese where Oktoberfest is held annually.

Marienplatz and Munich city centre is a 11-minute journey northbound on the U3 from Brudermühlstraße while southbound trains head towards Thalkirchen and eventually Fürstenried West. Trains run every 10 minutes or up to every 5 minutes in peak periods. On Sundays, trains run in 30 minute intervals.

References

External links

Munich U-Bahn stations
Railway stations in Germany opened in 1989
1989 establishments in West Germany